Mafeteng Airport  is an airport serving the city of Mafeteng, the capital of Mafeteng District, Lesotho.

See also

Transport in Lesotho
List of airports in Lesotho

References

External links
 Mafeteng Airport
 OurAirports - Mafeteng
OpenStreetMap - Mafeteng

 Google Earth

Airports in Lesotho